The 2009 AFC President's Cup was the fifth edition of the AFC President's Cup, a competition for football clubs in countries categorized as "emerging nations" by the Asian Football Confederation. Eleven teams competed for the title and were split up into three groups, playing each other team in their group once. The winner of each group and the best runner-up qualified for the semifinals, and the winners of the semifinal matches played in the final match to determine the winner.

Each group was to be played over a period of days in May and June at one venue - Group A at Dashrath Stadium, Nepal, Group B at Bangabandhu National Stadium, Dhaka and Group C at Spartak Stadium, Bishkek.

The final stage of the competition took place in Tajikistan from September 25–27.

Venues

Group stage

Final stage

Qualifying teams

1 No league held in 2008 so 2006–07 champions qualify.

Group stage

Group A

All matches played in Nepal.
Times listed are UTC+5:45.

Group B

All matches played in Bangladesh.
Times listed are UTC+6.

Group C

All matches played in Kyrgyzstan.
Times listed are UTC+6.

Best runner-up
The best runners-up team from among the three pools qualify for the semi-finals. Because group B consists of only three teams, matches against fourth-placed sides in the other groups are excluded from the following comparison.

Note on tie-breaking situation:
 WAPDA placed ahead of Abahani Ltd. on the basis of goal difference.

Final stage
Times listed are UTC+5.

Semi-finals

Final

References

External links
 AFC President's Cup 2009

3
2009
AFC President's
AFC President's
AFC President's
AFC President's
International association football competitions hosted by Tajikistan